The 1979 Benue State gubernatorial election occurred on July 28, 1979. NPN's Aper Aku won election for a first term to become Benue State's first executive governor leading and, defeating main opposition in the contest.

Aper Aku emerged the NPN candidate at the gubernatorial primary election, after defeating Isaac Shaahu and George Atedze. His running mate was Isah Odoma.

Electoral system
The Governor of Benue State is elected using the plurality voting system.

Results
There were five political parties registered by the Federal Electoral Commission (FEDECO) which participated in the election. Aper Aku of the NPN won the contest by polling the highest votes.

References 

Benue State gubernatorial elections
Benue State gubernatorial election
Benue State gubernatorial election